John Dupuis Cobbold (11 March 1861, Ipswich – 12 June 1929, Ipswich) was a member of the Ipswich based Cobbold family.

John was born at The Cliff, Ipswich. He was the son of John Patteson Cobbold and Adele Harriette Dupuis, daughter of George Dupuis, vice-provost of Eton College, where he was educated from 1874 to 1879. Here he played Rackets, winning several school contests becoming Keeper of Rackets for 1878–79.

On 24 August 1897 he presented the Racecourse Recreation Ground to the Ipswich Borough.

He was appointed High Sheriff of Suffolk in 1901. He was Mayor of Ipswich, 1914-15.

He joined Ipswich Fine Art Club in 1913 and remained a member until 1928 despite not exhibiting.

He died at Holywells Park, Ipswich on 12 June 1929 aged 68 and is buried in the graveyard of St Martin's church, Trimley St Martin, Suffolk.

References

1861 births
1929 deaths
High Sheriffs of Suffolk
Mayors of Ipswich, Suffolk
John Dupuis
People educated at Eton College